Causonis eurynema, commonly known as the soft water vine, is a plant in the grape family, found in Australia. A large woody climber usually seen in tropical forest. This plant was first collected at Comboyne in May, 1935. It was named by the eminent English botanist, Bill Burtt.

References

eurynema
Flora of New South Wales
Flora of Queensland